Loison-sous-Lens (literally Loison under Lens) is a commune in the Pas-de-Calais department in the Hauts-de-France region of France.

Geography
Loison-sous-Lens is a suburban town, one mile east of the centre of Lens, at the junction of the D917 and the D162 roads. Bounded to the west by the A21 autoroute and to the south by the Lens Canal.

Population

Places of interest
 The church of St.Vaast, dating from the twentieth century.
 A war memorial.

See also
Communes of the Pas-de-Calais department

References

External links

 Official Web site 
 Website of the Communaupole de Lens-Liévin 

Loisonsouslens
Artois